The Death and Life of Bobby Z, also known as Bobby Z and Let's Kill Bobby Z, is a 2007 American-German action film, directed by John Herzfeld, and starring Paul Walker, Laurence Fishburne, Olivia Wilde and Joaquim de Almeida. Sony Pictures Worldwide Acquisitions Group released the film direct-to-video in the United States. Don Winslow, who wrote the novel on which the film is based, acknowledged that the screen adaptation was not successful.

Plot
Don Huertero (Joaquim de Almeida) is a Mexican drug lord. His daughter committed suicide because a drug dealer known as Bobby Z broke her heart. Consequently, Don Huertero is out for vengeance. In trepidation, Bobby Z seeks shelter in an American embassy. From there he is handed over to federal agent Tad Gruzsa (Laurence Fishburne).

In order to get hold of Bobby Z after all, Don Huertero takes a colleague of Tad Gruzsa as hostage and proposes an exchange. Bobby Z knows Don Huertero will not rest until he believes him dead. Being worried sick, he bribes Tad Gruzsa. Now Tad Gruzsa conceives a plan to deceive Don Huertero. He wants to make Don Huertero believe Bobby Z was dead without harming the real Bobby Z.

When the exchange is supposed to take place, Tad Gruzsa replaces Bobby Z. In his stead the clueless doppelgänger Tim Kearney (Paul Walker), a former Marine and an inmate, crosses the border. During the exchange Tad Gruzsa incites a gunfight and tries to shoot the doppelgänger dead. Even so, Tim Kearney scarcely survives. But Tad Gruzsa keeps on trying to kill him. But he fails time after time. Despite all his efforts it is the real Bobby Z who is taken down. Tim Kearney on the other hand finds love (Elizabeth, played by Olivia Wilde as a kind of it girl).

Structure
The films starts by introducing "the legend of Bobby Z", an immensely successful and famous marijuana trafficker, yacht owner and surfer, described ecstatically as an entity of almost mythical proportions by an old man, representing the contemporary folklore of the Gold Coast of Baja California.

The film then goes on to describe the film's hero Tim Kearney, played by male leading actor Paul Walker. Exposition flashbacks and narrative by the relatively hostile FBI agents serve to portray Kearney as a somewhat reckless and uncontrollable, yet also likeable and brave character, who ends up in prison because of his former qualities.

When Kearney accepts Tad Gruzsa's offer, the audience does not know anything more than he does. Thus the film continues, following Tim Kearny as he successively collects information. The audience is never ahead of him. This and the fact that a great deal of the story has already happened before the hero gets involved, require flashbacks galore. As a result, the structure is highly interlaced.

The film ends with a few concluding remarks by the same old man of the Gold Coast that appeared in the introduction.

Cast
 Paul Walker as Tim Kearney
 Laurence Fishburne as Tad Gruzsa
 Olivia Wilde as Elizabeth
 Jason Flemyng as Brian
 Keith Carradine as Johnson
 Joaquim de Almeida as Don Huertero
 J. R. Villarreal as Kit
 Jason Lewis as Bobby "Bobby Z"
 Jacob Vargas as Jorge Escobar
 Michael Bowen as Duke
 M. C. Gainey as "Boom-Boom"
 Josh Stewart as "Monk"
 Margo Martindale as Macy
 Chuck Liddell as "Maddog"
 Bruce Dern as Hippy Narrator (uncredited)

Novel
The film is based on a 1997 novel of the same name by Don Winslow. The novel was positively reviewed by several newspapers.

See also
Don (film series), earlier Indian film franchise with similar premise

References

External links

Films about Mexican drug cartels
American psychological thriller films
2007 action thriller films
2007 films
2000s German-language films
Films directed by John Herzfeld
2000s English-language films
2007 multilingual films
American multilingual films
2000s American films
2000s Mexican films
Films about lookalikes
Films shot in Mexico
Films set in Mexico
American films about revenge
German films about revenge
Films about police corruption
Films set in prison
Films set in country houses
Films set on boats